Bkomra is a Sunni Muslim village in Koura District of Lebanon. It is also spelt Bkumra or Bkumrā.

References

Populated places in the North Governorate
Koura District
Sunni Muslim communities in Lebanon